Megaderus bifasciatus is a species of long-horned beetle in the family Cerambycidae. It is found in Central America and North America.

References

Further reading

 
 

Trachyderini
Articles created by Qbugbot
Beetles described in 1836